Naval Materials Research Laboratory (NMRL) is an Indian defence laboratory of the Defence Research and Development Organisation (DRDO). Located at Ambernath, in Thane district, Maharashtra. It develops materials and alloys for Naval use, and is a single-window agency for all materials requirement of the Indian Navy. NMRL is organized under the Naval Research & Development Directorate of DRDO. The present director of NMRL is Shri Prashant T Rojatkar.

History
NMRL was established in 1953 as the Naval Chemical and Metallurgical Laboratory, an in-house laboratory of the Navy, located at the Naval Dockyard, Mumbai. It was brought under the administrative control of DRDO  in the early 1960s. The laboratory is located in its own technical-cum residential complex at Ambernath, Maharashtra. The laboratory still has its erstwhile infrastructure intact in Naval Dockyard, Mumbai, without any physical scientific or administrative presence.

Areas of work
 Fuel Cell Power Pack Technology
 Advanced Protection Technology in Marine Environment
 Electrochemistry & Electrochemical Processes                         
 Polymer and Elastomer Science and Technology including Stealth Material
 Processing Technologies for Speciality Metallic and Non-metallic Materials
 Chemical and Biological Control of Marine Environment

Facilities

Projects and Products

Technologies for Civilian use
 Bio-emulsifier - for Bio-remediation of floating oil.
 Arsenic removal kit - NMRL has developed a low-cost arsenic removal filter to remove arsenic from contaminated drinking water. The filter is made of stainless steel, and the filter medium is a processed waste of the steel industry. The filter works on the principle of co-precipitation and adsorption, which is followed by filtration through treated sand. The complete filter costs Rs. 500, has a life of 5 years and does not require any electricity to run. After six months of testing in 24 Paraganas District in West Bengal, the technology was given to NGOs for productionizing.

References

External links
 NMRL Home Page

See also

Defence Research and Development Organisation laboratories
Research institutes in Maharashtra
Materials science institutes
Research and development in India
Ambarnath
1953 establishments in Bombay State
Research institutes established in 1953